Jhungara is a small village near Bakhshali in Pakistan.

Populated places in Mardan District